A bolon house is a Northern Sumatra traditional house in Indonesia. Bolon houses are also tourist objects in Northern Sumatra. Bolon houses are made with wood. The house floor is made with boards. The roof is made with rumbia leaves. Bolon houses have no individual rooms, but the space inside is divided. There is space for the house leader, for family meetings, for daughters that have married but have no house of their own, and for the oldest son that has already married. This space is influenced by Batak culture. In ancient times, bolon houses used to be the place where 13 kings of Batak live. Today, only a few bolon houses can be found in North Sumatra.

See also

 Geriten
 Gorga
 Batak architecture

References 

Rumah adat